William Jennings Cleveland, Sr. (October 19, 1902 – December 16, 1974), served in both houses of the Louisiana State Legislature from 1944 to 1964. He was also acting governor for one day in 1959.

References

 

 
 

1902 births
1974 deaths
People from Rapides Parish, Louisiana
People from Crowley, Louisiana
Democratic Party members of the Louisiana House of Representatives
Democratic Party Louisiana state senators
Businesspeople from Louisiana
American real estate businesspeople
20th-century American businesspeople
20th-century American politicians
Burials in Louisiana